Tomáš Kubalík (born May 1, 1990) is a Czech professional ice hockey forward who is currently an unrestricted free agent. He is the older brother to Dominik Kubalik who also plays professionally.

Playing career
As a youth, Kubalik played in the 2003 Quebec International Pee-Wee Hockey Tournament with a team from Chomutov. He later played with HC Plzeň 1929, before graduating to play three seasons with the men's team in the professional Czech Extraliga. He was selected by the Columbus Blue Jackets in the 5th round (135th overall) of the 2008 NHL Entry Draft. He made his NHL debut with the Blue Jackets in the tail end of the 2010–11 season, finishing with 2 assists in 4 games.

During the following 2011–12 season, Kubalik scored his first NHL goal on January 13, 2012, against Jason LaBarbera of the Phoenix Coyotes.

On March 10, 2013, Kubalik was traded from Columbus to the Winnipeg Jets in exchange for Spencer Machacek.

On June 7, 2013, Kubalik left his short tenure with the Blue Jackets organization and returned to the Czech Republic to sign for the Kontinental Hockey League club, HC Lev Praha on a one-year deal.

After a one season in Finland with KalPa of the Liiga, Kubalik left as a free agent to sign his third consecutive one-year deal in a new league, in agreeing to terms with German club, ERC Ingolstadt of the DEL on May 4, 2015.

Career statistics

Regular season and playoffs

International

References

External links

1990 births
Living people
Columbus Blue Jackets draft picks
Columbus Blue Jackets players
HC Dukla Jihlava players
ERC Ingolstadt players
KalPa players
HC Lev Praha players
HC Plzeň players
Sportspeople from Plzeň
St. John's IceCaps players
HC Slovan Bratislava players
Springfield Falcons players
Vaasan Sport players
Victoriaville Tigres players
Czech ice hockey right wingers
Czech expatriate ice hockey players in Canada
Czech expatriate ice hockey players in the United States
Czech expatriate ice hockey players in Germany
Czech expatriate sportspeople in Poland
Czech expatriate sportspeople in France
Expatriate ice hockey players in France
Expatriate ice hockey players in Poland
Czech expatriate ice hockey players in Finland
Czech expatriate ice hockey players in Slovakia